Airport Road, also known as Tongi Diversion Road, a part of the Dhaka-Mymensingh Highway (N3), is an 8-lane major artery road in Dhaka, that connects Dhaka city, with the Shahjalal International Airport. It is also the main artery that connects Dhaka with the northern suburb of Uttara and the only road that connects Dhaka with northern Districts of Bangladesh and vice versa. Traffic is fairly smooth throughout the road, due to flyovers and interchanges.

Facilities
Built as a highway to facilitate movement with northern districts of Bangladesh. The 8 lane highway (4 lanes on each side) is one of the best maintained roads in Bangladesh, It has a divider; however it doesn't have a shoulder for emergency and breakdown.

Landmarks

 Shahjalal International Airport
 Balaka Bhaban, Kurmitola
 Airport Railway Station
 Bangladesh Navy Headquarters
 Dhaka Cantonment
 Cantonment Station
 Radisson Blu Water Garden Hotel
 Best Western Dhaka
 Le Meridien Dhaka
 Dusit Thani Princess Dhaka
 Dhaka Regency
 Army Golf Club
 Heroes Live Forever Monument

References

Transport in Dhaka
Roads in Dhaka